Michael Smith (born 4 September 1988) is a Northern Irish professional footballer who plays as a defender for Scottish Premiership club Heart of Midlothian and the Northern Ireland national team. Before moving to Scotland, Smith previously played for Ballyclare Comrades and Ballymena United in Northern Ireland, and Bristol Rovers and Peterborough United in England.

At Hearts, Smith has mostly been utilised as a right-back – either as a fullback or more recently as a wing-back – however often deputises as a centre-back (often as the right-most of a back three) when needed.

Smith has received several honours, including the Ballymena United Player of the Year in 2009–10, and Bristol Rovers Player of the Year in 2012–13.

Club career

Early career 
Smith began playing football under the management of his father at Greenisland Boys Club and was picked up by his first senior club, Ballyclare Comrades in 2005. He signed for Ballymena United in January 2009, and made over 100 appearances for them before moving to England to join Bristol Rovers in 2011.

Bristol Rovers
He made his debut on 6 August 2011, in a 3–2 victory away against AFC Wimbledon. He made his home debut on 13 August in a 1–2 defeat to local rivals Torquay United.

Smith scored his first goal for Rovers in the League Cup against Ipswich Town, which Bristol Rovers lost 3–1.

Peterborough United
On 25 July 2014, Smith moved to Peterborough United, signing a three-year deal.

Heart of Midlothian
On 30 June 2017, Michael Smith signed for Hearts in the Scottish Premiership. He signed a two-year deal, wearing the number 2 shirt previously worn by Callum Paterson.

On 7 January 2021, Smith signed an 18-month contract extension. In January 2022 he signed another one-year contract extension, keeping him at the club until the end of the 2022–23 season.

International career
Smith received his first call-up to the senior Northern Ireland squad on 16 March 2016 for friendlies against Wales and Slovenia. He scored his first international goal on 19 November 2019, in a 6–1 defeat against Germany.

Career statistics

International goals
Scores and results Northern Ireland's goal tally first.

Honours
Individual
Ballyclare Comrades Young Player of the Year: 2006–07, 2007–08
Ballymena United Player of the Year: 2009–10
Ballymena United Players' Player of the Year: 2009–10
Ballymena United Goal of the Season: 2009–10
Bristol Rovers Player of the Year: 2012–13
Bristol Rovers Player of the Year: 2013–14
PFA Team of the Year: 2013–14 League Two
PFA Scotland Team of the Year: 2020–21 Scottish Championship

References

External links

Michael Smith profile at the Peterborough United F.C. website

1988 births
Living people
People from Ballyclare
Association footballers from Northern Ireland
Northern Ireland international footballers
Association football defenders
Ballyclare Comrades F.C. players
Ballymena United F.C. players
Bristol Rovers F.C. players
Peterborough United F.C. players
NIFL Premiership players
English Football League players
Heart of Midlothian F.C. players
Scottish Professional Football League players